Peter William Likins (born July 4, 1936) was president of the University of Arizona from 1997 until his retirement in summer 2006.

Previous posts in order of most recent were:
 President of Lehigh University
 Provost for professional schools at Columbia University,
 Dean of Columbia's engineering school.
At each of these universities, Likins was a professor of engineering.

Likins graduated from Santa Cruz High School in 1953, where he was captain of the wrestling team and co-captain of the football team. He attended Stanford University and became a member of Delta Tau Delta International Fraternity.

During the last semester of his presidency, a wire from his pacemaker poked a hole in his heart, causing him to nearly faint during an emergency drill being conducted on campus at the time. He underwent open heart surgery soon thereafter. Under different conditions emergency medical personnel might not have been able to respond in time to save him.

Likins was elected a member of the National Academy of Engineering (1984) for contributions to spacecraft dynamics and control, and for leadership in engineering education through teaching, research, writing, and academic administration.

Notes

Sources
 4.lehigh.edu

Presidents of Lehigh University
Columbia University faculty
Presidents of the University of Arizona
Living people
1936 births
Santa Cruz High School alumni